The following is a list of notable events and releases of the year 1896 in Norwegian music.

Events

Deaths

 September
 29 – Johan Gottfried Conradi, composer, choir leader, and conductor (born 1820).

 December 
 13 – Emma Dahl, soprano singer and Lieder composer (born 1819).

Births

 July
 27 – Ivar F. Andresen, operatic singer (died 1940).

 November
 3 – Trygve Lindeman, cellist and the head of the Oslo Conservatory of Music (born 1979).

 December 
 30 – Hans Stenseth, flautist and flute teacher (died 1994).

See also
 1896 in Norway
 Music of Norway

References

 
Norwegian music
Norwegian
Music
1890s in Norwegian music